The 2005 season was the Cleveland Browns' 53rd in the National Football League (NFL) and their 57th overall. It was their 1st season under general manager Phil Savage and head coach Romeo Crennel. They posted a record of 6–10, improving upon their 2004 record of 4–12. However, the Browns failed to qualify for the playoffs for the third consecutive season.

Offseason

2005 NFL Draft

Undrafted free agents

Personnel

Roster

Schedule 
In addition to their regular games with AFC North rivals, the Browns played teams from the AFC South and NFC North as per the schedule rotation, and also played intraconference games against the Miami Dolphins and the Oakland Raiders based on divisional positions from 2004.

Note: Intra-divisional opponents are in bold text.

Standings

External links 
 2005 Cleveland Browns at Pro Football Reference (Profootballreference.com)
 2005 Cleveland Browns Statistics at jt-sw.com
 2005 Cleveland Browns Schedule at jt-sw.com
 2005 Cleveland Browns at DatabaseFootball.com  

Cleveland
Cleveland Browns seasons
Cleveland